Shunchang County is a county under the administration of Nanping City, in the northwest of Fujian province, People's Republic of China. The county's name was established in 933, during the Tang Dynasty.  It has a total  population of approximately 241,200 people as of the end of 2003. It is a key region for forestry and the production of coarse bamboo in Fujian.

Administrative divisions

Shunchang County administers one subdistrict, seven towns, and four rural townships. The subdistrict is Shuangxi. The towns include Jianxi, Yangkou, Yuankeng, Bushang, Dali, Dagan, and Renshou. The rural townships include Yangdun, Zhengfang, Lanxia, and Gaoyang.

Geography

Shunchang County has two major brooks, Futunxi and Jinxi, as well as numerous smaller tributaries.

Specialty 
 Renshou Guandan

Notable people
 Hou Yuzhu
 Zhang Guozheng

Climate

References

 
County-level divisions of Fujian
Nanping